The University of Illinois Urbana-Champaign's College of Agricultural, Consumer and Environmental Sciences (ACES) is part of the University of Illinois Urbana-Champaign and is considered by some to be the top school of agriculture-related sciences in the world. Most of the ACES buildings are located on the South Quad. In terms of staff, ACES has 186 tenure-system faculty, 78 specialized faculty, 26 postdoctoral researchers, 493 academic professionals, 565 civil service staff, 323 assistants, and 956 hourly employees.

Facilities
 ACES Library, Information and Alumni Center
 Turner Hall
 Animal Sciences Laboratory
 Edward R. Madigan Laboratory
 Agriculture Engineering Sciences Building
 Mumford Hall, named for Herbert Windsor Mumford I
 Bevier Hall

Departments
 Agricultural and Biological Engineering

The undergraduate Agricultural Engineering program at the University of Illinois Urbana-Champaign was ranked 1st and the undergraduate engineering program was ranked 5th in the 2008 America's Best Colleges edition of U.S. News & World Report (published in August 2007). The graduate engineering program at Illinois was ranked 5th in the 2007 Best Graduate Schools issue of U.S. News & World Report (published in March 2007). (College of Engineering) (ACES News)
 Agricultural and Consumer Economics
 Agricultural Education
 Animal Sciences
 Technical Systems Management
 Crop Sciences
 Food Science and Human Nutrition
 Human Development and Family Studies
 Natural Resources and Environmental Sciences
 Agroecology/Sustainable Agriculture Program
 Division of Nutritional Sciences

Deans
 Herbert Windsor Mumford I (1922–1938)
 John R. Campbell (1983–1988)
 W. R. (Reg) Gomes (1989–1995)
 David L. Chicoine (1996–2001)
 Robert A. Easter (2002–2009)
 Robert J. Hauser (2009–2016)
 Kimberlee K. Kidwell (2017–present)

References

External links
 

Illinois
Agriculture
1867 establishments in Illinois
Educational institutions established in 1867